Mahassar is a 1991 Indian Malayalam film, directed by C. P. Vijayakumar.  The film has musical score by Raveendran.

Cast
Sukumaran as M. G. Panikkar
M. G. Soman as Venugopal
KPAC Sunny as Judge
Mala Aravindan as Shivadasan
Raghu as Suresh
Abhilasha as Shari
Bobby Kottarakkara as Babu

Soundtrack
The music was composed by Raveendran and the lyrics were written by Hari Kudappanakkunnu.

References

External links
 

1991 films
1990s Malayalam-language films